Daniel Alfonso Castillo (born August 25, 1979) is a retired American mixed martial artist. A professional from 2007 until 2015, he competed in 22 bouts with both the UFC and WEC.

Mixed martial arts career

Early career
Castillo began training MMA when he joined the wrestling team at his high school in suburban Sacramento. His vice principal, who was also the wrestling coach, told Castillo that if he joined the team, he would not call his mother after seeing Castillo constantly in trouble. Castillo claims he was scared his first day at practice, "I got the [expletive] kicked out of me that day, but after that, I wasn't nervous at wrestling practice ever." After leaving private school, Castillo graduated from Laguna Creek High School (Elk Grove, CA) and attended Menlo College; becoming an NAIA All American in 2004. His nickname "Last Call" was given to him in college due to his ability perform well in his team's offseason morning runs despite having been up consuming massive amounts of alcohol until last call.

He made his professional debut in November 2007, fighting twice in the month, winning both fights via first round submission. After going 3-0, Castillo signed to fight on the Palace Fighting Championship's seventh card. He fought Andy Salazar winning via submission due to his tough ground and pound.

He won his fifth straight fight after defeating Strikeforce veteran, Isaiah Hill. With the win, Castillo was signed with the WEC.

World Extreme Cagefighting
Castillo made his debut against Donald Cerrone at WEC 34, replacing an injured Rich Crunkilton.  Cerrone defeated Castillo via first round armbar submission.

Castillo then fought Rafael Dias at WEC 36, winning via TKO in the second round.

Four months later Castillo fought Phil Cardella at WEC 39.  Castillo won the fight via split decision.

Castillo then defeated Ricardo Lamas, winning his third straight WEC fight.

Castillo was defeated by Shane Roller via third round submission at WEC 44.

Castillo looked to rebound from his loss to Roller when he fought Anthony Pettis at WEC 47, but lost via KO after getting caught flush with a head kick.

Castillo defeated WEC newcomer Dustin Poirier via unanimous decision on August 18, 2010 at WEC 50.

Castillo next faced Will Kerr on December 16, 2010 at WEC 53.  He won the fight via KO in the first round.

Ultimate Fighting Championship
In October 2010, World Extreme Cagefighting merged with the Ultimate Fighting Championship. As part of the merger, all WEC fighters were transferred to the UFC. On December 31, 2010, Castillo officially became a contracted UFC fighter, signing a four-fight deal with the promotion.

In his UFC debut, Castillo fought Joe Stevenson on March 3, 2011 at UFC Live: Sanchez vs. Kampmann. Castillo controlled the entirety of the fight and won via unanimous decision.

Castillo faced Jacob Volkmann on August 14, 2011 at UFC on Versus 5. He lost the fight via unanimous decision (29-28, 29-28, 29-28).

Castillo faced Shamar Bailey on November 19, 2011 at UFC 139. Bailey came in 3 pounds over, which resulted being fined 20 percent of his earnings, and the bout took place at a catchweight of 158 lb.  Castillo won the fight via TKO in the first round.

Castillo faced Anthony Njokuani on December 30, 2011 at UFC 141 on five weeks notice, replacing an injured Ramsey Nijem. Throughout the fight Castillo scored several suplex takedowns and looked to smother his opponent on the ground. He won the fight via split decision.

Castillo faced John Cholish on May 5, 2012 at UFC on Fox 3. He defeated Cholish via unanimous decision (30-27, 30-27, 30-27).

Castillo was expected to face Michael Johnson on September 1, 2012 at UFC 151.  However, after UFC 151 was cancelled, Castillo/Johnson was rescheduled and took place on October 5, 2012 at UFC on FX 5. After a dominant first round put in by Castillo, where he nearly finished Johnson via strikes and then with a submission attempt, he was knocked out cold with a counter left at 1:06 of the second round.

Castillo faced Paul Sass on February 16, 2013 at UFC on Fuel TV: Barão vs. McDonald.  Castillo used a superior top game and ground and pound en route to a unanimous decision victory.

Castillo was expected to face Bobby Green on July 27, 2013 at UFC on Fox 8.  However, in mid-July, Green pulled out of the bout citing an injury and was replaced by Tim Means. He won the fight via unanimous decision.

Castillo faced Edson Barboza on December 14, 2013 at UFC on Fox 9. After a dominant first round by Castillo, Barboza was able to rally over rounds two and three, and defeated Castillo via majority decision in a bout that earned both participants Fight of the Night honors.

Castillo was briefly linked to a bout with Isaac Vallie-Flagg on April 26, 2014 at UFC 172.  However, the UFC removed Vallie-Flagg from the bout in favor of a match up with Takanori Gomi, while Castillo instead fought against Charlie Brenneman. Castillo won the fight via knockout in the second round.

Castillo was expected to face Tony Ferguson on August 2, 2014 at UFC 176.  However, after UFC 176 was cancelled, Castillo/Ferguson was rescheduled and took place on August 30, 2014 at UFC 177. Castillo lost the back and forth fight via split decision.

Castillo was expected to face Rustam Khabilov on January 3, 2015 at UFC 182.  However, Khabilov pulled out of the bout due to alleged visa issues and was replaced by Paul Felder. Castillo lost the bout via knockout due to a spinning backfist in the second round.

A rescheduled bout with Rustam Khabilov was expected to take place on July 25, 2015 at UFC on Fox 16. However, for a second time, Khabilov was removed from the pairing due to alleged visa issues. Castillo faced Jim Miller at the event. He lost the fight by split decision.

Castillo faced Nik Lentz on December 19, 2015 at UFC on Fox 17. He lost the fight by split decision.

On January 29, 2016, Castillo was released from the UFC.

Championships and accomplishments
Ultimate Fighting Championship
Fight of the Night (One time)

Mixed martial arts record

|-
|Loss
|align=center| 17–10
|Nik Lentz
|Decision (split)
|UFC on Fox: dos Anjos vs. Cowboy 2 
|
|align=center|3
|align=center|5:00
|Orlando, Florida, United States
|
|-
|Loss
|align=center|17–9
|Jim Miller
|Decision (split)
|UFC on Fox: Dillashaw vs. Barão 2
|
|align=center|3
|align=center|5:00
|Chicago, Illinois, United States
|
|-
| Loss
| align=center| 17–8
| Paul Felder
| KO (spinning back fist)
| UFC 182
| 
| align=center| 2
| align=center| 2:09
| Las Vegas, Nevada, United States
| 
|-
| Loss
| align=center| 17–7
| Tony Ferguson
| Decision (split)
| UFC 177
| 
| align=center| 3
| align=center| 5:00
| Sacramento, California, United States
| 
|-
| Win
| align=center| 17–6
| Charlie Brenneman
| KO (punch)
| UFC 172
| 
| align=center| 2
| align=center| 0:21
| Baltimore, Maryland, United States
| 
|-
| Loss
| align=center| 16–6
| Edson Barboza
| Decision (majority)
| UFC on Fox: Johnson vs. Benavidez 2
| 
| align=center| 3
| align=center| 5:00
| Sacramento, California, United States
| 
|-
| Win
| align=center| 16–5
| Tim Means
| Decision (unanimous)
| UFC on Fox: Johnson vs. Moraga
| 
| align=center| 3
| align=center| 5:00
| Seattle, Washington, United States
|  
|-
| Win
| align=center| 15–5 
| Paul Sass
| Decision (unanimous)
| UFC on Fuel TV: Barão vs. McDonald
| 
| align=center| 3
| align=center| 5:00
| London, England
| 
|-
| Loss
| align=center| 14–5
| Michael Johnson
| KO (punches)
| UFC on FX: Browne vs. Bigfoot
| 
| align=center| 2
| align=center| 1:06
| Minneapolis, Minnesota, United States
| 
|-
| Win
| align=center| 14–4
| John Cholish
| Decision (unanimous)
| UFC on Fox: Diaz vs. Miller
| 
| align=center| 3
| align=center| 5:00
| East Rutherford, New Jersey, United States
| 
|-
| Win
| align=center| 13–4
| Anthony Njokuani
| Decision (split)
| UFC 141
| 
| align=center| 3
| align=center| 5:00
| Las Vegas, Nevada, United States
| 
|-
| Win
| align=center| 12–4
| Shamar Bailey
| TKO (punches)
| UFC 139
| 
| align=center| 1
| align=center| 4:52
| San Jose, California, United States
|  
|-
| Loss
| align=center| 11–4
| Jacob Volkmann
| Decision (unanimous)
| UFC Live: Hardy vs. Lytle
| 
| align=center| 3
| align=center| 5:00
| Milwaukee, Wisconsin, United States
| 
|-
| Win
| align=center| 11–3
| Joe Stevenson
| Decision (unanimous)
| UFC Live: Sanchez vs. Kampmann
| 
| align=center| 3
| align=center| 5:00
| Louisville, Kentucky, United States
| 
|-
| Win
| align=center| 10–3
| Will Kerr
| KO (punches)
| WEC 53
| 
| align=center| 1
| align=center| 1:25
| Glendale, Arizona, United States
| 
|-
| Win
| align=center| 9–3
| Dustin Poirier
| Decision (unanimous)
| WEC 50
| 
| align=center| 3
| align=center| 5:00
| Las Vegas, Nevada, United States
| 
|-
| Loss
| align=center| 8–3
| Anthony Pettis
| KO (head kick and punches)
| WEC 47
| 
| align=center| 1
| align=center| 2:17
| Columbus, Ohio, United States
| 
|-
| Loss
| align=center| 8–2
| Shane Roller
| Submission (rear-naked choke)
| WEC 44
| 
| align=center| 3
| align=center| 3:32
| Las Vegas, Nevada, United States
| 
|-
| Win
| align=center| 8–1
| Ricardo Lamas
| TKO (punches)
| WEC 42
| 
| align=center| 2
| align=center| 4:15
| Las Vegas, Nevada, United States
| 
|-
| Win
| align=center| 7–1
| Phil Cardella
| Decision (split)
| WEC 39
| 
| align=center| 3
| align=center| 5:00
| Corpus Christi, Texas, United States
| 
|-
| Win
| align=center| 6–1
| Rafael Dias
| TKO (punches)
| WEC 36
| 
| align=center| 2
| align=center| 2:54
| Hollywood, Florida, United States
| 
|-
| Loss
| align=center| 5–1
| Donald Cerrone
| Submission (armbar)
| WEC 34
| 
| align=center| 1
| align=center| 1:30
| Sacramento, California, United States
| 
|-
| Win
| align=center| 5–0
| Isaiah Hill
| Submission (rear-naked choke)
| CCFC: Mayhem
| 
| align=center| 1
| align=center| 2:46
| Santa Rosa, California, United States
| 
|-
| Win
| align=center| 4–0
| Andy Salazar
| Submission (punches)
| Palace Fighting Championship 7
| 
| align=center| 1
| align=center| 1:02
| Lemoore, California, United States
| 
|-
| Win
| align=center| 3–0
| Noah Shinable
| TKO (punches)
| Cage Combat Fighting Championships
| 
| align=center| 2
| align=center| 2:42
| Sonoma, California, United States
| 
|-
| Win
| align=center| 2–0
| Gigo Jara
| Submission (rear-naked choke)
| GC 73: High Noon
| 
| align=center| 1
| align=center| 3:45
| Sacramento, California, United States
| 
|-
| Win
| align=center| 1–0
| Billy Terry
| Submission (rear-naked choke)
| GC 71: Lock-n-Load
| 
| align=center| 1
| align=center| 2:10
| Porterville, California, United States
|

See also
 List of current UFC fighters
 List of male mixed martial artists

References

External links 
 
 

Living people
American male mixed martial artists
Mixed martial artists from California
Lightweight mixed martial artists
Mixed martial artists utilizing wrestling
Mixed martial artists utilizing Brazilian jiu-jitsu
Sportspeople from Sacramento, California
1979 births
Ultimate Fighting Championship male fighters
American practitioners of Brazilian jiu-jitsu
People awarded a black belt in Brazilian jiu-jitsu